Romuald Szukiełowicz (born 3 September 1943) is a retired Polish football manager. From 1994 to 2001 he was a member of the Board of Coaches for the PZPN.

Career
Szukiełowicz started his career at Śląsk Wrocław, and progressed from the youth team into the senior team. After his time at Śląsk he joined Odra Wrocław. Between 1979 and 1983 he spent his time in Chicago, USA, playing for Lightning Chicago and Ajax Chicago.

After his playing career Szukiełowicz moved into management, firstly in the US with Lightning Chicago, before moving back to Poland joining Odra Wrocław firstly, then Śląsk Wrocław managing their second team. After short spells with Piast Iłowa and MKS Oława, he rejoined Śląsk Wrocław, this time managing the first team. After three seasons with Śląsk in the Ekstraklasa, Szukiełowicz left to join MKS Oława for the second time, and then Pogoń Szczecin in 1992.

Szukiełowicz was only with Pogoń for one season. After which he with Zawisza Bydgoszcz, before spending seasons with Śląsk Wrocław in 1995–96, Pogoń Szczecin 1996–97, Hutnik Nowa Huta 1997–98. After Hutnik, he had a string of jobs where he did not spend longer than a year with the teams. In 2000 he was manager of Lechia-Polonia Gdańsk, a team which was created as a merger of Lechia Gdańsk and Polonia Gdańsk. Szukiełowicz was the last permanent manager of the team, before it fully disbanded in 2002, with Lechia and Polonia both having to start from the lowest divisions of Polish football after the separation.

After short spells with KS Polkowice, Odra Opole, Górnik Konin, and Bystrzyca Kąty Wrocławskie, he moved back to the US to manage Polonia New York from 2005–06, and then Zagłębie Sosnowiec for 2007. After being in the job for only a few months, Szukiełowicz was then without a role in management until 2011, with Czarni Żagań, who he was with until 2012. 

After another few years without a managerial job, Szukiełowicz returned in 2015, a year in which he worked with four teams. Firstly with Flota Świnoujście, Zagłębie Sosnowiec, Foto-Higiena Gać, before joining Śląsk Wrocław  for the third time, Szukiełowicz's last job as a manager.

References 

Living people
1949 births
Sportspeople from Wrocław
Polish footballers
Śląsk Wrocław players
Polish football managers
Śląsk Wrocław managers
Lechia Gdańsk managers
Odra Opole managers
Pogoń Szczecin managers
Association footballers not categorized by position